Hilmar High School serves students from the rural community of Hilmar and Stevinson, California, United States.

History

Hilmar High School was founded in 1911, and was originally known as Hilmar Colony Union High School. There were 26 students the first year. Classes were originally held on the second floor of an elementary school. The high school moved into its own brick building in 1919, and then to its current campus in 1957.

Future Farmers of America (FFA) has been active at the school since 1930.

It is part of the Hilmar Unified School District, which is a K-12 rural school district with approximately 2277 students. The district operates five schools: Hilmar High School, Irwin and Colony High School, Hilmar Middle School, Elim Elementary School, and Merquin Elementary School.

Extracurricular activities
Much of the community revolves around the high school's sports and agricultural programs.  The school has had particular success with its FFA activities, including several national championships.

Athletics
Hilmar High School belongs to the Trans Valley League in the Sac-Joaquin Section of the California Interscholastic Federation. The school's teams, known as the Hilmar Yellowjackets, compete in: baseball, basketball, cross country, football, golf, soccer, softball, tennis, track, volleyball, swimming  and wrestling.

Notable alumni
 Nate Costa
 Dot Jones

References

External links
 Hilmar High School home page
 Hilmar Unified School District home page
 Merced County Office of Education home page
High schools in Merced County, California

Public high schools in California
Educational institutions established in 1911